John Joseph Murphy (born July 19, 1953) is an American former backstroke and freestyle swimmer  who won a gold medal as a member of the U.S. team in the men's 4×100-meter freestyle relay at the 1972 Summer Olympics in Munich, Germany.  At the 1972 Olympics, the 19-year-old also earned a bronze medal in the men's 100-meter backstroke.  He attended Indiana University, where he swam for coach James Counsilman's Indiana Hoosiers swim team in National Collegiate Athletic Association (NCAA) competition.

Murphy currently resides in Los Alamos, New Mexico, and serves as a youth swim team coach.

See also
 List of Indiana University (Bloomington) people
 List of Olympic medalists in swimming (men)
 List of World Aquatics Championships medalists in swimming (men)
 World record progression 4 × 100 metres freestyle relay

References
 
 Indiana Hoosiers
 Hoosier Olympians

1953 births
Living people
American male backstroke swimmers
American male freestyle swimmers
World record setters in swimming
Indiana Hoosiers men's swimmers
Olympic bronze medalists for the United States in swimming
Olympic gold medalists for the United States in swimming
Swimmers from Chicago
Place of birth missing (living people)
Swimmers at the 1971 Pan American Games
Swimmers at the 1972 Summer Olympics
World Aquatics Championships medalists in swimming
Medalists at the 1972 Summer Olympics
Pan American Games gold medalists for the United States
Pan American Games silver medalists for the United States
Pan American Games medalists in swimming
Medalists at the 1971 Pan American Games
20th-century American people
21st-century American people